Jeff Parker (born January 3, 1974) is an American novelist and short story writer. His novel Ovenman was published in 2007 by the book division of the literary journal Tin House. Parker received praise from within the literary community for his hypertext story A Long Wild Smile which has appeared in numerous online journals.

Parker grew up in Tallahassee, Florida, and received a B.S. in Journalism from the University of Florida. He attended the prestigious creative writing program at Syracuse University where he studied with such writers as George Saunders and Arthur Flowers. He graduated with an M.F.A. in creative writing in 1999. He previously served as a faculty member at the University of Toronto, lectured in Russian State University for the Humanities and ELE public forum in Moscow, and served as the Director of the Creative Writing M.F.A. at the University of Tampa. He is currently a member of University of Massachusetts Amherst's M.F.A. faculty  and Director of Disquiet International Literary Program.

Bibliography 
2004 "Amerika: Russian Writers View the United States" (as co-editor). Dalkey Archive Press. 
2004 "Life & Limb: Skateboarders Writer from the Deep End" (novel excerpt). Brooklyn, New York: Soft Skull Press. 
2007 "The Back of the Line" Decode, Inc. 
2007 "Ovenman" (novel) Portland, OR: Tin House Books. 
2009 "Rasskazy: New Fiction From a New Russia" (as co-editor) Portland, OR: Tin House Books. 
2010 "The Taste of Penny" Dzanc Books. 
2014 "Sankya" (as Translator) DISQUIET. 
2015 "Where Bears Roam the Streets" Harper Perennial. 
2015 "Erratic Fire, Erratic Passion" Featherproof Books. 
2015 "A Manner of Being" University of Massachusetts Press.

References

External links 
The Back of the Line (Official Author Site)
I Am Ovenman (official site of Ovenman)
Ink Q&A (interview with Powell's)
Ovenman at Tin House Books
Rasskazy: New Fiction from a New Russia at Tin House Books

21st-century American novelists
American male novelists
Living people
1974 births
Novelists from Florida
University of Florida alumni
American male short story writers
21st-century American short story writers
21st-century American male writers